On Broadway (Vol. 1) is the ninth studio album from Australian vocal group The Ten Tenors, released in May 2014. The album peaked at number 44 on the ARIA Charts.

The Ten Tenors promoted the album with an Australian tour across June and July 2014.

Track listing

Charts

Release history

References

2014 albums
Warner Records albums
The Ten Tenors albums